Mário Jorge Lobo Zagallo (born 9 August 1931) is a Brazilian former professional football player, coordinator and manager, who played as a forward. 

Zagallo holds the record for World Cup titles in general with four titles in total. He was the first person to win the FIFA World Cup as both a manager and as a player, winning the competition in 1958 and 1962 as a player, in 1970 as manager, and in 1994 as assistant manager. Zagallo also coached Brazil in 1974 (finishing fourth) and in 1998 (finishing as runners-up) and was a technical assistant in 2006. He is the first of three men, along with Germany's Franz Beckenbauer and France's Didier Deschamps to have won the World Cup as a player and as a manager and the only one that has done it more than twice.

In 1992, Zagallo received the FIFA Order of Merit, the highest honour awarded by FIFA, for his contributions to football. He was named the 9th Greatest Manager of All Time by World Soccer Magazine in 2013. With the death of Pelé  on 29 December 2022, Zagallo is now the last surviving Brazilian player who participated in the 1958 World Cup Final.

Early life 
Zagallo was born in Atalaia on 9 August 1931. As a young man, he worked as a soldier, working at the Maracanã Stadium when Uruguay defeated Brazil in the 1950 World Cup final.

Playing career

Zagallo started his football career with América in 1948, and he later played for Flamengo and Botafogo.

He won the World Cup as a player with Brazil in 1958 and 1962. At the time of the 1958 tournament, Zagallo was a Flamengo player, but by the 1962 event, he was with Botafogo.

He won a total of 33 caps for Brazil between 1958 and 1964.

Style of play

Zagallo was a diminutive left winger with a small physique, who was known for his technical skills and his high defensive work-rate, as well as his ability to make attacking runs from deeper areas of the pitch. He was also capable of playing as a forward, either as a main striker, or as an inside forward.

Coaching career
Zagallo started his coaching career at Botafogo, the club he had finished his career with, managing them alongside the Brazil national team. Zagallo won the World Cup as a manager in 1970, and as assistant coach in 1994, both with Brazil. He was the first person to win the World Cup both as a player and as a manager. Winning the World Cup in 1970 at the age of 38, he is also the second youngest coach to win a World Cup, after Alberto Suppici, who won aged 31 with Uruguay in 1930.

Personal life
Zagallo (original family name Zakour, a Lebanese surname from Zahle) married Alcina de Castro on 13 January 1955 at the Church of Capuchins in Rio de Janeiro. They remained together until de Castro's death on 5 November 2012. Mário and Alcina had four children. He is a practicing Catholic.

Nicknames
Zagallo was nicknamed The Professor by his players throughout his coaching career, due to his tactical awareness and commanding presence on the bench. He was also nicknamed Velho Lobo ("Old Wolf") due to his surname "Lobo", which means "wolf".

Managerial statistics

Honours

Player
Flamengo
 Rio de Janeiro State Championship: 1953, 1954, 1955

Botafogo
 Rio-São Paulo Tournament: 1962, 1964
 Rio de Janeiro State Championship: 1961, 1962

Brazil
 FIFA World Cup: 1958, 1962

Individual
 FIFA World Cup All-Star Team: 1962
 Brazilian Football Museum Hall of Fame

Coordinator
Brazil
 FIFA World Cup: 1994

Manager
Botafogo
 Campeonato Brasileiro Série A: 1968
 Rio de Janeiro State Championship: 1967, 1968

Fluminense
 Rio de Janeiro State Championship: 1971

Flamengo
 Copa dos Campeões: 2001
 Rio de Janeiro State Championship: 1972, 2001

Al-Hilal
 Saudi Premier League: 1978–79

Brazil
 FIFA World Cup: 1970
 Copa América: 1997
 FIFA Confederations Cup: 1997

Individual
 IFFHS World's Best National Coach: 1997
 World Soccer Magazine 9th Greatest Manager of All Time: 2013
 FourFourTwo 27th Greatest Manager of All Time: 2020

See also

 List of FIFA World Cup records and statistics#Coaching
 List of Brazil national football team managers

References
 Roberto Assaf, Clóvis Martins. Campeonato carioca: 96 anos de história, 1902–1997. Irradiação Cultural (1997).

External links

!colspan="3" style="background:#C1D8FF;"| World Cup-winners status
|-

|-
!colspan="3" style="background:#C1D8FF;"| World Cup Finals

1931 births
Living people
Brazilian football managers
Brazilian Roman Catholics
Brazilian people of Lebanese descent
Brazil national football team managers
Kuwait national football team managers
Saudi Arabia national football team managers
United Arab Emirates national football team managers
Brazilian footballers
CR Flamengo footballers
1958 FIFA World Cup players
1962 FIFA World Cup players
FIFA World Cup-winning players
1970 FIFA World Cup managers
1974 FIFA World Cup managers
1995 Copa América managers
1997 Copa América managers
1997 FIFA Confederations Cup managers
1998 FIFA World Cup managers
CR Flamengo managers
FIFA World Cup-winning managers
FIFA Confederations Cup-winning managers
Fluminense FC managers
Brazil international footballers
Al Hilal SFC managers
Brazilian expatriate football managers
Expatriate football managers in Kuwait
Expatriate football managers in Saudi Arabia
Botafogo de Futebol e Regatas managers
Botafogo de Futebol e Regatas players
Bangu Atlético Clube managers
Campeonato Brasileiro Série A managers
1976 AFC Asian Cup managers
Association football forwards
Association football wingers
Brazilian expatriate sportspeople in Kuwait
Brazilian expatriate sportspeople in Saudi Arabia
Brazilian expatriate sportspeople in the United Arab Emirates
Expatriate football managers in the United Arab Emirates
Sportspeople of Lebanese descent
Sportspeople from Alagoas